Kolathur is a small town in Malappuram district of Kerala, India. It connects Malappuram with Pulamanthole and Perinthalmanna with Valancheri.

Connectivity
Kolathur-Malappuram road connects the town with district HQ. Nearest railways station is at Angadippuram. Its one of the major junctions on the way to Thrissur from Malappuram via Pattambi and Valancheri to Nilambur. Nearest towns connected are Malappuram, Angadippuram, Valancheri, Perinthalmanna, Pulamanthole, etc.

References

Villages in Malappuram district
Perinthalmanna area